InterFM  (JODW-FM 89.7 MHz Tokyo, 76.5 MHz Yokohama) is a Japanese commercial radio station on the FM band, transmitting in the Greater Tokyo area (including Narita International Airport), and owned and operated by . Since September 2020, it is a subsidiary of The Japan FM Network Company, owner of until then rival Tokyo FM. InterFM was formerly the key station of MegaNet.

InterFM started broadcasting from its new frequency of 89.7 MHz on June 26, 2015 with its first official broadcast started on June 30 the same year at 6:00 p.m. InterFM ended broadcasting on its old frequency (76.1 MHz) on October 31, 2015.

Programming
InterFM's slogan is The Real Music Station since April 2013. Its previous slogan was "Tokyo's No. 1 Music Station".

The station uses English as its main language besides Japanese, with the Public Service Announcement segments aired in Mandarin Chinese, Korean, Tagalog, Indonesian, Spanish, Thai, Portuguese, and French to better serve the international community in the Tokyo Metropolitan area and its vicinity, not to mention news and other information bits in Japanese that the locals will find convenient.

70% of its airtime is dedicated to music created and played worldwide, while the remaining 30% goes to Japanese pop and rock music selected in large part by a committee.

InterFM broadcast style mirrors American FM radio style and is consistent with stations in networks such as iHeartMedia in the United States.

Shareholders

Current
The Japan FM Network Company (since September 2020)

Past
The Japan Times (past)
TV Tokyo (past)
Kinoshita Management Inc. (2016-2020)

See also
 MegaNet
 Japan FM Network
 FM COCOLO
 Love FM
 Radio Neo

References

External links 
  
 About InterFM897 

Radio stations in Japan
Radio in Japan
Radio stations established in 1996
Mass media companies based in Tokyo
Filipino-language radio stations